The Short Titles Act 1896 (59 & 60 Vict c 14) is an Act of the Parliament of the United Kingdom. It replaces the Short Titles Act 1892.

This Act was retained for the Republic of Ireland by section 2(2)(a) of, and Part 4 of Schedule 1 to, the Statute Law Revision Act 2007. In that country, this Act is one of the Short Titles Acts 1896 to 2007.

Section 1 and Schedule 1 authorised the citation of 2,095 earlier Acts by short titles. The Acts given short titles were passed between 1351 and 1893. This Act gave short titles to all public general Acts passed since the Union of England and Scotland and then in force, which had not already been given short titles, except for those omitted from the Revised Edition of the Statutes by reason of their local or personal character.

In 1995, the Law Commission and the Scottish Law Commission recommended that section 1 and Schedule 1 be repealed.

Section 1 and Schedule 1 were repealed by section 1(1) of, and Part IV  of Schedule 1 to, the Statute Law (Repeals) Act 1995. Notwithstanding these repeals, such citations are still authorized by section 19(2) of the Interpretation Act 1978.

Section 3
This section was repealed by section 25(1) of, and Schedule 3 to, the  Interpretation Act 1978. It is replaced by section 19(2) of that Act.

Section 4
This section repealed the Short Titles Act 1892. It was in turn repealed by section 1 of, and the Schedule to, the Statute Law Revision Act 1908.

Schedule 1
Section 1 of, and the Schedule to, the Statute Law Revision Act 1908 repealed the entries relating to the following Acts:
Linen and Hempen Manufactories (Scotland) Act 1726 13 Geo 1 c 26
Fisheries (Scotland) Act 1726 13 Geo 1 c 30
Justices Qualification Act 1731 5 Geo 2 c 18
Justices Qualification Act 1744 18 Geo 2 c 20
Marine Insurance Act 1745 19 Geo 2 c 37
Inclosure Act 1756 29 Geo 2 c 36
Inclosure Act 1757 31 Geo 2 c 41
Inclosure (Consolidation) Act 1801 41 Geo 3 UK c 109
Inclosure Act 1821 1 & 2 Geo 4 c 23
Royal Burghs (Scotland) Act 1822 3 Geo 4 c 91
Masters and Workmen Arbitration Act 1824 5 Geo 4 c 96
Quarantine Act 1825 6 Geo 4 c 78
Licensing (Scotland) Act 1828 9 Geo 4 c 58
Charities (Ireland) Act 1832 2 & 3 Will 4 c 85
Royal Burghs (Scotland) Act 1833 3 & 4 Will 4 c 76
Parliamentary Burghs (Scotland) Act 1833 3 & 4 Will 4 c 77
Common Fields Exchange Act 1834 4 & 5 Will 4 c 30
Registration of Aliens Act 1836 6 & 7 Will 4 c 11
Poor Relief (Loans) Act 1836 6 & 7 Will 4 c 107
Inclosure Act 1836 6 & 7 Will 4 c 115
Land Tax Redemption Act 1837 7 Will 4 & 1 Vict c 17
County Dublin Baronies Act 1838 1 & 2 Vict c 115
County Institutions (Ireland) Act 1838 1 & 2 Vict c 116
Stannaries Act 1839 2 & 3 Vict c 58
Inclosure Act 1840 3 & 4 Vict c 31
Manufacturies Improvement Fund (Scotland) Act 1847 10 & 11 Vict c 91
County Cess (Ireland) Act 1848 11 & 12 Vict c 32
Indictable Offences (Ireland) Act 1849 12 & 13 Vict c 69
Burghs (Scotland) Act 1852 15 & 16 Vict c 32
Berwickshire Courts Act 1853 16 & 17 Vict c 27
Licensing (Scotland) Act 1853 16 & 17 Vict c 67
Land Tax Redemption Act 1853 16 & 17 Vict c 74
Education Department Act 1856 19 & 20 Vict c 116
Burgesses (Scotland) Act 1860 23 & 24 Vict c 47
Boundaries of Burghs Extension (Scotland) Act 1861 24 & 25 Vict c 36
Turnpike Trusts Relief Act 1861 24 & 25 Vict c 46
Dogs (Ireland) Act 1862 25 & 26 Vict c 59
Dogs (Scotland) Act 1863 26 & 27 Vict c 100
Chain Cable and Anchor Act 1864 27 & 28 Vict c 27
Poor Law Officers Superannuation Act 1864 27 & 28 Vict c 42
Lancaster Palatine Court Act 1865 28 & 29 Vict c 40
Dogs Act 1865 28 & 29 Vict c 60
Public Works (Ireland) Act 1867 30 & 31 Vict c 112
Justices Qualification Act 1871 34 & 35 Vict c 18
Colonial Attorneys Relief Act 1874 37 & 38 Vict c 41
Mersey Collisions Act 1874 37 & 38 Vict 52
Justices Qualification Act 1875 38 & 39 Vict c 54
Burgesses Qualification (Scotland) Act 1876 39 & 40 Vict c 12
Burgh Wards (Scotland) Act 1876 39 & 40 Vict c 25
Pauper Children (Ireland) Act 1876 39 & 40 Vict c 38
Borough Quarter Sessions Act 1877 40 & 41 Vict c 17
Lunatic Asylum Loans (Ireland) Act 1878 41 & 42 Vict c 24
Public Works Loans Act 1880 43 & 44 Vict c 1

In column 3, against the Act 5 Geo 4 c 82, the words "The Clerk of the Parliaments Act 1824" were substituted for the words "The Clerk of Parliaments Act 1824" by section 2 of, and paragraph 2(1) of Schedule 3 to, the Statute Law (Repeals) Act 1978. Paragraph 2(2) of Schedule 3 to the Statute Law (Repeals) Act 1978 provided that a corresponding change was to be made in any existing citation of the Clerk of Parliaments Act 1824 5 Geo 4 c 82, but without prejudice to the validity of any citation not so amended.

This Schedule was amended for the Republic of Ireland by section 5 of the Statute Law Revision Act 2007.

Schedule 2
Section 2(1) and Schedule 2 originally authorised the citation of 132 groups of Acts by collective titles.

Section 1 of, and the Schedule to, the Statute Law Revision Act 1908 repealed the entries relating to the following groups of Acts:

The Factory and Workshop Acts 1878 to 1895
The Friendly Societies Acts 1875 to 1895
The Justices Qualification Acts 1731 to 1875
The Licensing (Scotland) Acts 1828 to 1887
The Open Spaces Acts 1877 to 1890

In 1995, the Law Commission and the Scottish Law Commission recommended the repeal of a further 74 collective titles.

Section 1(1) of, and  Part IV of Schedule 1 to, the Statute Law (Repeals) Act 1995 repealed the entries relating to the following groups of Acts:

The Bank Notes Acts 1826 to 1852
The Bankruptcy Acts 1883 to 1890
The Bankruptcy (Scotland) Acts 1856 to 1881
The Baths and Washhouses Acts 1846 to 1882
The Births, Deaths, and Marriages (Scotland) Acts 1854 to 1860
The Births and Deaths Registration (Ireland) Acts 1863 to 1880
The Bridges Acts 1740 to 1815
The Bridges (Ireland) Acts 1813 to 1875
The British Subjects Acts 1708 to 1772
The Building Societies Acts 1874 to 1894
The Burial Grounds (Scotland) Acts 1855 to 1886
The Charitable Trusts Acts 1853 to 1894
The Companies Acts 1862 to 1893
The Congested Districts Board (Ireland) Acts
The Copyright Acts 1734 to 1888
The Coroners (Ireland) Acts 1829 to 1881
The County Courts (Ireland) Acts 1851 to 1889
The County Infirmaries (Ireland) Acts 1805 to 1833
The Drainage and Improvement of Lands (Ireland) Acts 1863 to 1892
The Drainage and Navigation (Ireland) Acts 1842 to 1857
The Durham County Palatine Acts 1836 to 1889
The East India Company (Money) Acts 1786 to 1858
The East India Loans Acts 1859 to 1893
The Education (Scotland) Acts 1872 to 1893
The Elementary Education Acts 1870 to 1893
The Endowed Schools Acts 1869 to 1889
The Fisheries (Ireland) Acts 1842 to 1895
The Government Annuities Acts 1829 to 1888
The Herring Fisheries (Scotland) Acts 1821 to 1890
The Highway Acts 1835 to 1885
The International Copyright Acts
The Judicature (Ireland) Acts 1877 to 1888
The Juries Acts 1825 to 1870
The Justiciary Court (Scotland) Acts 1783 to 1892
The Labourers (Ireland) Acts 1883 to 1892
The Lancaster County Palatine Acts 1794 to 1871
The Licensing (Ireland) Acts 1833 to 1886
The Life Assurance Companies Acts 1870 to 1872
The Lunacy (Scotland) Acts 1857 to 1887
The Lunacy (Ireland) Acts 1821 to 1890
The Matrimonial Causes Acts 1857 to 1878
The Medical Acts
The Merchandise Marks Acts 1887 to 1894
The Metropolis Management Acts 1855 to 1893
The Municipal Corporations (Ireland) Acts 1840 to 1888
The Naval Enlistment Acts 1835 to 1884
The Patents, Designs, and Trade Marks Acts 1883 to 1888
The Petroleum Acts 1871 to 1881
The Police Acts 1839 to 1893
The Police (Scotland) Acts 1857 to 1890
The Post Office Acts 1837 to 1895
The Post Office (Duties) Acts 1840 to 1891
The Post Office (Management) Acts 1837 to 1884
The Post Office (Money Orders) Acts 1848 to 1883
The Post Office (Offences) Acts 1837 and 1884
The Post Office Savings Bank Acts 1861 to 1893
The Prison Acts 1865 to 1893
The Prisons (Scotland) Acts 1860 to 1887
The Prisons (Ireland) Acts 1826 to 1884
The Public Libraries Acts 1892 and 1893
The Public Libraries (Ireland) Acts 1855 to 1894
The Public Libraries (Scotland) Acts 1887 and 1894
The Public Money Drainage Acts 1846 to 1856
The Salmon Fisheries (Scotland) Acts 1828 to 1868
The Salmon and Freshwater Fisheries Acts 1861 to 1892
The Small Debt (Scotland) Acts 1837 to 1889
The Solicitors Acts 1839 to 1894
The Solicitors (Ireland) Acts 1849 to 1881
The Superannuation Acts 1834 to 1892
The Trustee Savings Banks Acts 1863 to 1893
The Trusts (Scotland) Acts 1861 to 1891
The Universities and College Estates Acts 1858 to 1880
The Weights and Measures Acts 1878 to 1893
The Yeomanry Acts 1802 to 1826

The entries relating to the following groups of Acts were not repealed by either the Statute Law Revision Act 1908 or the Statute Law (Repeals) Act 1995:

The Bank of England Acts 1694 to 1892
The Bank of Ireland Acts 1808 to 1892
The Bank Notes (Scotland) Acts 1765 to 1854
The Bank Notes (Ireland) Acts 1825 to 1864
The Births and Deaths Registration Acts 1836 to 1874
The Burial Acts 1852 to 1885
The Burial (Ireland) Acts 1824 to 1868
The Church Building Acts 1818 to 1884
The Cinque Ports Acts 1811 to 1872
The Companies Clauses Acts 1845 to 1889
The Constabulary (Ireland) Acts 1836 to 1885
The Conveyancing Acts 1881 to 1892
The Court of Session Acts 1808 to 1895
The Crown Lands Acts 1829 to 1894
The Defence Acts 1842 to 1873
The Ecclesiastical Commissioners Acts 1840 to 1885
The Ecclesiastical Courts Acts 1787 to 1860
The Entail Acts
The Evidence Acts 1806 to 1895
The Grand Juries (Ireland) Acts 1816 to 1895
The Greenwich Hospital Acts 1865 to 1892
The House of Commons (Disqualifications) Acts 1715 to 1821
The Inclosure Acts 1845 to 1882
The Judicature Acts 1873 to 1894
The Juries (Scotland) Acts 1745 to 1869
The Juries (Ireland) Acts 1871 to 1894
The Land Law (Ireland) Acts
The Land Purchase (Ireland) Acts
The Landed Property Improvement (Ireland) Acts
The Licensing Acts 1828 to 1886
The Marriage Acts 1811 to 1886
The Metropolitan Commons Acts 1866 to 1878
The Metropolitan Police Acts 1829 to 1895
The National Debt Acts 1870 to 1893
The New Parishes Acts 1843 to 1884
The Parliamentary Costs Acts 1847 to 1879
The Penal Servitude Acts 1853 to 1891
The Poor Relief (Ireland) Acts 1838 to 1892
The Public Health Acts
The Public Schools Acts 1868 to 1873
The Public Works (Ireland) Acts 1831 to 1886
The Queen Anne's Bounty Acts 1706 to 1870
The Railway and Canal Traffic Acts 1854 to 1894
The Railway Regulation Acts 1840 to 1893
The School Sites Acts
The Sea Fisheries Acts 1843 to 1893
The Settled Land Acts 1882 to 1890
The Telegraph Acts 1863 to 1892
The Tithe Acts 1836 to 1891
The Town Police Clauses Acts 1847 and 1889
The Tramways (Ireland) Acts 1860 to 1895
The Trustee Appointment Acts 1850 to 1890
The Vestries Acts 1818 to 1853

See also
Short Titles Act

References
HL Deb vol 34, col 198, vol 37, cols 217 and 1364, vol 38, col 1329, vol 40, cols 722,  862, 991 and 1414, vol 42, col 1193, HC Deb vol 40, col 720, vol 41, cols 781, 1416, 1651 and 1754, vol 42, cols 129, 628, 736, 899, 1003, 1046 and 1192.

External links

Irish Statute Book (Republic of Ireland):
 Short Titles Act 1896 text as amended to c.1908
 List of amendments and repeals since 1908

United Kingdom Acts of Parliament 1896